Go After an Easy Prey (Chinese: 瓮中捉鳖) is a Chinese animated film in black and white from 1948. It is also referred to as "Turtle Caught in a Jar".

Translation
The title of the film is a phrase describing something as easy to catch as a turtle.  The off English translation may be "shooting fish in a barrel".

Background
The film was produced by the Northeast Film Studio during its transitional phase with the downfall of the puppet government Manchukuo.

Story
The film is believed to be more of a documentary view of China's civil war in the 1940s when Chiang Kai-shek was considered to be favored and aided by U.S imperialism. He was metaphorically described as trapped like a turtle by the People's Liberation Army.

References

External links
 The film at China's Movie Database

1948 animated films
1948 films
Chinese animated short films
Chinese animated films
1940s Mandarin-language films
Chinese black-and-white films